Berenson-Allen Center for Non-Invasive Brain Stimulation (abbreviated as CNBS or BACNBS) is a brain research institute at Beth Israel Deaconess Medical Center (BIDMC) of Harvard Medical School in the Longwood Medical and Academic Area of Boston, Massachusetts. The center is specialized in research, educating, and clinical care using non-invasive brain stimulation techniques such as transcranial magnetic stimulation (TMS), transcranial direct current stimulation (tDCS). Non-invasive brain stimulation is applied as a diagnostic and therapeutic tool on patients with various neuropsychiatric disorders like depression, schizophrenia, epilepsy, dystonia, Parkinson's disease, chronic pain, and the neurorehabilitation of motor function, cognition, and language after stroke or traumatic brain injury. Berenson Allen Center was previously directed by Prof. Alvaro Pascual-Leone.

References

External links
Official website

Harvard Medical School
Neuroscience research centers in the United States
Research institutes in Massachusetts